Mahmood Hasan Khan is an Indian politician. He was elected to the Lok Sabha, lower house of the Parliament of India as a member of the Janata Party.

References

External links
 Official biographical sketch in Lok Sabha website

India MPs 1980–1984
India MPs 1984–1989
Lok Sabha members from Uttar Pradesh
1930 births
Living people